Scott Matzka (May 11, 1978 – December 16, 2018) was an American professional ice hockey player.

Personal life
After retiring from hockey, Matzka revealed he was diagnosed with Amyotrophic lateral sclerosis (ALS). Following his diagnosis, he created an organization called "My Turn" to raise awareness and funds for ALS treatment. He died from ALS on December 16, 2018, at the age of 40.

Career statistics

Awards and honors

References

External links

1978 births
2018 deaths
People from Port Huron, Michigan
Sportspeople from Metro Detroit
Atlantic City Boardwalk Bullies players
BSC Preussen Berlin players
Cardiff Devils players
Cleveland Barons (2001–2006) players
Neurological disease deaths in Michigan
Deaths from motor neuron disease
Esbjerg Energy players
ETC Crimmitschau players
Grand Rapids Griffins players
Jokipojat players
Kalamazoo Wings (ECHL) players
Michigan Wolverines men's ice hockey players
Odense Bulldogs players
Omaha Lancers players
Örebro HK players
Tappara players
American men's ice hockey centers
Ice hockey players from Michigan
American expatriate ice hockey players in Germany
American expatriate ice hockey players in Denmark
American expatriate ice hockey players in Sweden
American expatriate ice hockey players in Finland
American expatriate ice hockey players in Wales
NCAA men's ice hockey national champions